Lachnagrostis filiformis (syn. Agrostis avenacea) is a species of grass known by the common names Pacific bent grass, New Zealand wind grass, fairy grass, or blown-grass. It is native to Australia, New Zealand, and other Pacific Islands including New Guinea and Easter Island. While it is found in a wide variety of habitats, it seems particularly invasive in areas with damp soils, such as areas near bodies of water. It has been introduced to southern Africa, the United Kingdom, Taiwan, the southern United States and Mexico.

Pacific bent grass is a tufted perennial grass growing up to 65 centimeters tall. The leaf blades are flat and about 8-25 centimeters long and 2-3 millimeters wide. The stems, which are round or polygonal, are hollow. The inflorescence, which appears in June and July, may be from 7-30 centimeters long. It consists of a panicle of wispy strands, each with several tiny, fuzzy spikelets at the end. The spikelets are two or three millimeters long.

In Australia it is a fire hazard, and interferes with trains.

Lachnagrostis filiformis is known elsewhere as an introduced species and sometimes a noxious weed. It is particularly invasive in California, where it is a weed of sensitive vernal pool ecosystems around San Diego.

See also
 Invasive species

References

External links
Jepson Manual Treatment
USDA Plants Profile
Photo gallery

avenacea
Bunchgrasses of Australasia
Grasses of New Zealand
Poales of Australia
Taxa named by Johann Friedrich Gmelin